Jens Christian Sørensen (born 20 August 1949 in Aarhus) is a Danish former sprint canoeist who competed in the early 1970s. He was eliminated in the semifinals of the K-2 1000 m event at the 1972 Summer Olympics in Munich.

References
 Sports-reference.com profile

1949 births
Canoeists at the 1972 Summer Olympics
Danish male canoeists
Living people
Olympic canoeists of Denmark
Sportspeople from Aarhus